Georgios Kougioumtsidis is a Greek freestyle wrestler. He won the gold medal in the 79 kg event at the 2022 European Wrestling Championships held in Budapest, Hungary.

Career 

In March 2021, he competed at the European Qualification Tournament in Budapest, Hungary hoping to qualify for the 2020 Summer Olympics in Tokyo, Japan. In May 2021, he failed to qualify for the Olympics at the World Qualification Tournament held in Sofia, Bulgaria. He competed in the 79 kg event at the 2021 World Wrestling Championships held in Oslo, Norway. He won his first two matches and he was then eliminated by eventual bronze medalist Nika Kentchadze of Georgia.

In March 2022, he won the gold medal in his event at the European U23 Wrestling Championship held in Plovdiv, Bulgaria. In that same month, he also won the gold medal in the 79 kg event at the 2022 European Wrestling Championships held in Budapest, Hungary. He competed in the 79kg event at the 2022 World Wrestling Championships held in Belgrade, Serbia.

Achievements

References

External links 

 

Living people
2001 births
Greek male sport wrestlers
European Wrestling Championships medalists
European Wrestling Champions
21st-century Greek people
Sportspeople from Thessaloniki